is a meromictic lake in Abashiri, Hokkaidō, Japan. It is located in Abashiri Quasi-National Park. The Abashiri and Memanbetsu Rivers flow into the lake. Water exits the lake through the Abashiri River again and flows  to the Sea of Okhotsk.

History and formation
From core samples taken from the lake bed, the lake basin appears to have first formed some 20,000 years ago during the last period of glaciation. During the last 6000 years, the Abashiri River carved out the lake bed. Artifacts from the Jōmon period have been found in the area around the Memanbetsu River. In modern times, the course of the Abashiri River has been straightened to provide for irrigation resulting in a serious siltation problem for the lake.

Freezing and salinity

The lake freezes over from December to April with ice up to a meter thick. The reduced inflow of water during the winter season causes saltwater to flow upstream from the Sea of Okhotsk and into the lake.

Fauna
The wakasagi (Hypomesus nipponensis) and corbicula (Corbicula japonica) are common in the lake.

References

Lakes of Hokkaido